Andrej Klinar (5 February 1942 in Jesenice – 5 April 2011 in Bled) was a Slovenian alpine skier who competed for Yugoslavia in the 1964 Winter Olympics and 1968 Winter Olympics.

External links
 sports-reference.com

1942 births
2011 deaths
Slovenian male alpine skiers
Olympic alpine skiers of Yugoslavia
Alpine skiers at the 1964 Winter Olympics
Alpine skiers at the 1968 Winter Olympics
Sportspeople from Jesenice, Jesenice